Band-e Bon (also Romanized as Band Bon; also known as Band Bonak, Bandebun, Estakhr-e Kīān, and Esţalakh Kīān) is a village in Deylaman Rural District, Deylaman District, Siahkal County, Gilan Province, Iran. At the 2006 census, its population was 74, in 22 families.

References 

Populated places in Siahkal County